Dabo kolo (Amharic:  (d'abo kolo),) is an Ethiopian and Eritrean snack and finger food consisting of small pieces of baked bread.

Dabo kolo means corn bread in the Amharic language, with dabo for bread, and kolo for corn or roasted barley, chickpeas,  sunflower seeds, other local grains and peanuts.

Kolo bread wrapped in a paper cone is often sold by local kiosks and street vendors. It is prepared by frying small pieces of dough cut from rolls. Sometimes honey is added to make dabo kolo sweeter.
Dabo kolo is also considered a Congolese finger food.
A rare alternative recipe is dabo kolo made from coffee beans.

Festivities
Dabo kolo is a special dish during the Ethiopian New Year festivities. It is traditionally served during Shabbat meals by the Beta Israel (Ethiopian Jews).

See also
 List of Ethiopian and Eritrean dishes and foods

References

Ethiopian cuisine
Eritrean cuisine
Democratic Republic of the Congo cuisine
Republic of the Congo cuisine
Shabbat food